Geoffrey Soupe (born 22 March 1988) is a French professional road bicycle racer, who currently rides for UCI ProTeam . Soupe was the 2010 under-23 French national champion for the road race, and finished second to Great Britain's Alex Dowsett in the European under-23 time trial championship.

Career
Born in Viriat, Ain, Soupe competed for the EC Bourg-en-Bresse, VC Bressan and VC Vaulx-en-Velin setups as a junior, and the C.C. Etupes Le Doubs squad as an amateur, before joining the  professional team for the 2011 season as a neo-pro. In his first race for the team, Soupe won the opening stage of La Tropicale Amissa Bongo in Gabon – beating 's Anthony Charteau in a two-man sprint – before finishing the race in eighth place overall. Soupe later added a stage victory in the Tour Alsace, before quitting the race the next day.

Soupe made his Grand Tour début at the 2012 Giro d'Italia, taking a third-place finish during the race's first mass-start stage in Herning, Denmark; a result that Soupe stated that he was "sorry" for, after he was supposed to be leading out the team's main sprinter Arnaud Démare, until he was caught up in a final-corner crash.

In August 2014  announced that they had signed Soupe, alongside FDJ teammate Nacer Bouhanni, for 2015. He was named in the start list for the 2015 Tour de France.

Major results

2008
 1st  Overall Tour du Béarn
2009
 National Under-23 Road Championships
2nd Road race
3rd Time trial
 2nd Overall Boucles de la Marne
 3rd Souvenir Michel Roques
 5th Chrono des Herbiers
 8th Time trial, UEC European Under-23 Road Championships
2010
 1st  Road race, National Under-23 Road Championships
 2nd  Time trial, UEC European Under-23 Road Championships
 10th Time trial, UCI Under-23 Road World Championships
2011
 1st Stage 1 Tour Alsace
 5th Ronde Pévéloise
 8th Overall La Tropicale Amissa Bongo
1st Stage 1
2012
 5th Tour du Doubs
2013
 10th Overall Four Days of Dunkirk
2017
 6th La Roue Tourangelle
2019
 8th Elfstedenronde
2020
 9th Overall Saudi Tour
2023
 1st  Overall La Tropicale Amissa Bongo
1st Stage 1

Grand Tour general classification results timeline

References

External links

FDJ-BigMat profile 

Cycling Quotient profile

French male cyclists
1988 births
Living people
Sportspeople from Ain
Cyclists from Auvergne-Rhône-Alpes